Warren T. Wright Farmhouse Site is a historic archaeological site located near Millsboro, Sussex County, Delaware. It once included a farmhouse similar to the nearby Robert Davis Farmhouse, but this was destroyed by a fire in the 1970s. The remains are partially visible.  Warren Wright was a leader in the nativist movement during the period of the Indian River Nanticoke community.

It was added to the National Register of Historic Places in 1979.

References

Archaeological sites on the National Register of Historic Places in Delaware
Houses in Sussex County, Delaware
Nanticoke tribe
National Register of Historic Places in Sussex County, Delaware